Jean-Louis Heinrich (22 May 1943 – 15 September 2012) was a French professional footballer who played as a goalkeeper.

Career
Born in Ars-sur-Moselle, Heinrich played for Metz and Monaco.

References

1943 births
2012 deaths
French footballers
FC Metz players
AS Monaco FC players
Association football goalkeepers